Subsaxibacter broadyi is a Gram-negative, strictly  aerobic and chemoheterotrophic bacterium from the genus of Subsaxibacter.

References

Flavobacteria
Bacteria described in 2005